Newcastle United F.C. first played European football with their appearance in the 1968–69 Inter-Cities Fairs Cup, a competition which they won. Their first Champions League appearance came in 1997–98. Newcastle's first and last appearance in the Cup Winners' Cup came in 1998–99.

According to UEFA their only official UEFA title was won in the UEFA Intertoto Cup.

As of the 2017–18 season, they have played a total of 16 seasons in European football. Alan Shearer is the club's leading goalscorer in European competition with 30 goals. Shay Given has made the most appearances in European competition for Newcastle with 54.

Results by season

Source for Fairs Cup:

Overall record

Top goalscorers

Source:

References

Champions League results and line-ups - newcastle united mad
http://www.nufc.co.uk/page/Club/History/Records

Further reading
 K. Fletcher, Magpies in Europe: From Antwerp to Zurich. (2011)
 Paul Joannou, The Grand Tour: Newcastle United's Adventures in Europe. (2006)

Newcastle United F.C.
English football clubs in international competitions